Tiempo Perfecto is the first album released by Mexican rock band, Coda. It was released in 1990.

Track listing
 "Intro" - 0:30 
 "Girara (Hasta Caer)" - 3:36 
 "Suelto El Deseo" - 3:43 
 "Sin Dinero" - 3:20 
 "Tiempo Perfecto" - 3:44 
 "Espía" - 4:23 
 "Por Que te Fuiste" - 5:14 
 "Con O Sin Tí" - 5:18 
 "Como Un Tiro" - 1:20

Personnel
 Salvador Aguilar - lead vocals
 Toño Ruiz - guitars
 Chucho Esquivel - drums
 Zitto Bremont - bass
 Diego Benyure - keyboards

Notes

References
Album Info at Heavy Harmonies.

Coda (band) EPs
1990 EPs